Kevin Hawkins may refer to:

Kevin Hawkins, character in the film, Almost Summer
Kevin Hawkins, character in Jack & Jill (novel)